The Ex-Man is a 2018 Taiwanese television series starring Rainie Yang, Lan Cheng-lung, Johnny Lu and Li Xing. Filming started on 27 July 2017 and ended on 15 November 2017. The first original broadcast was on TTV every Friday at 10:00 pm starting 18 May 2018.

Plot 
Li Qin Ai (Rainie Yang) is a 31-year-old magazine photographer who is happy with her career and her relationship with her boyfriend, Zhou Li Yang (Johnny Lu). She has tried hard to forget her first love, Dai Hai An (Lan Cheng-lung), after they broke up 10 years ago. When Hai An reappears in Qin Ai's life unexpectedly, some things are just not right with him. First of all, he is still his 18-year-old self from their youth, and he is “half-transparent”.

Qin Ai begins to wonder why she is the only person who can “see” Hai An and if he's actually dead and appearing before her as a ghost. Whatever may be going on, it's obvious that Hai An has no intention of leaving her alone and negotiates with Qin Ai to live with her.
Could this be Hai An's way of reconciling his past with Qin Ai, or could this strange situation make Qin Ai question the certainty of her future?

Cast

Main cast 
Rainie Yang as Li Qin Ai 黎親愛
Lan Cheng-lung as Dai Hai An 戴海安
Johnny Lu as Zhou Li Yang 周立陽
Li Xing as Zhong Shu Ying 鍾書盈

Supporting cast 
Heaven Hai as Chen Da Fa 陳大發
Hsueh Shih-ling as Xu Sheng Ren 許聖仁
Kerr Hsu as editor-in-chief
Hsieh Chiung-hsuan as Li Wang Hua 黎王花
Cai Ah Bao as Li Yu Shu 黎玉樹
He Yi Qi as Shan Ling 閃靈
Duke Wu as Li Bao Bei 黎寶貝
Long Chen Han (隆宸翰) as Steve
Yu Chen (雨晨) as Huang Mei Zhen (Xiao Mei) 黃美珍 (小美)
Yu Yan Chen (余彥宸) as Zhong Zi Qi (Qi Qi) 鍾子奇 (奇奇)
Alice Huang as Joyce

Soundtrack 
 (猴lonely) by Harlem Yu
Lessons In Love (忘課) by Rainie Yang
Courage (勇氣) by Chang Chen-yue
Youth Lies Within (青春住了誰) by Rainie Yang
There'll Be A Day (總有一天) by Fang Wu
Process of Love (陶瓷) by Rennie Wang
Don't Love Him (沒那麼愛他) by Christine Fan
 (壞東西) by Makiyo Kawashima
You Love Her So Much (你那麼愛她) by Kevin Lin feat. Sam Lee
I Wanna Be With You by Jill Hsu
It's You (就是你) by Christine Fan

Ratings

Broadcast information

References

External links
The Ex Man TTV Official Website 
The Ex Man GTV Official Website 
  
 

2018 Taiwanese television series debuts
2018 Taiwanese television series endings
Taiwanese television series
Taiwan Television original programming
Gala Television original programming